The Maxus T90 is a mid-size pickup truck produced by SAIC Maxus. The T90 is the flagship Maxus pickup truck, sitting above the more affordable Maxus T60 and Maxus T70 series.

Specifications

The cabin of the Maxus T90 has a 10.25-inch digital dash cluster and a 12-inch central display which are both slightly turned to face the driver, resulting in an asymmetrical instrumental panel design. The Maxus T90 sold in China is equipped with the Zebra Zhixing system, which is equipped with remote control, voice recognition, car navigation, Bluetooth key, online clips, online music, group travel, video projection and smart home control.

Powertrains
The engines are mated to 6-speed manual, 6-speed automatic and 8-speed ZF automatic transmissions. Upper trim models support 12 driving modes. The driver can switch between 2H, 4H, AUTO and 4L driving modes with Eco, Power, and Normal driving modes through a simple button control. Four-wheel-drive is available as an optional feature.

Markets
In November 2022, the LDV eT60 and LDV eDeliver 9 were launched in Australia.

Gallery

References

External links
 T90 official site (Chinese)

Cars of China
Pickup trucks
Rear-wheel-drive vehicles
All-wheel-drive vehicles
Off-road vehicles
T90
Cars introduced in 2021
Production electric cars